Nicole Mitchell may refer to:

 K. Nicole Mitchell, magistrate judge of the U.S. District Court for the Eastern District of Texas
 Nicole Mitchell (musician) (born 1967), American jazz flautist
 Nicole Mitchell (meteorologist) (born 1974), American meteorologist
 Nikole Mitchell (born 1974), Jamaican sprinter
 Nicole Mitchell (cyclist), road cyclist from Bermuda
 Nicole Mitchell (politician), politician from Minnesota